María Galiana Medina (born 31 May 1935) is a Spanish actress. She won the Goya Award for Best Supporting Actress for her portrayal of the mother in Alone. She owes much of her popularity to her performance as Herminia in Cuéntame.

Biography 
Born in Seville on 31 May 1935, Galiana earned a licentiate degree in Philosophy and Letters and has worked as a high school teacher on history and art history in addition to her acting career. She made her film debut as an actress in Pasodoble (1988).

Filmography

Film

Television

Awards

References

External links 
 

1935 births
Living people
People from Seville
Spanish film actresses
Best Supporting Actress Goya Award winners
Actresses from Andalusia